Isadoro Anthony "Izzy" Jannazzo (January 31, 1915 – June 18, 1995) was an American professional boxer who challenged Barney Ross for the NYSAC, NBA, and The Ring magazine world welterweight championship in November 1936, and took the Maryland version of the World Welterweight Championship in October 1940.  In 1937, he fought national welterweight champions before large crowds in Australia and Germany.  In 1940, he was listed as the world's top welterweight contender by some sources.  His managers were Guy Anselmi and Chris Dundee.

Early life and career
Isadoro Jannazzo was born on January 31, 1915, in Ensley, Alabama to poor Sicilian Italian parents Francesca and Anthony Jannazzo. He would become part of a family of six, which included a sister Bernice and brothers Vincent and Sam and would live in his hometown until roughly the age of seventeen.  He may have boxed in as many as one hundred amateur bouts, and once contended for a state bantamweight championship around the age of fourteen. After his family's move to New York around 1932, his mother died, causing him to shoulder additional financial responsibility for the support of his family. In 1941, Izzy married Francesca "Frances" Tombrello, who was five years his junior.  Francesca's family, who had also lived in Ensley, Alabama, where she was born, had been friends of his family for many years.  Francesca and her family moved to New York shortly after his.  Izzy and his wife would settle on Troutman Street in Brooklyn, New York, in attached buildings near other family members.

Fighting in the New York City area, primarily Brooklyn or the Bronx between December 6, 1932, and January 13, 1934, he won nine of nineteen fights, losing six and drawing three times. He was not considered a power hitter yet won 65 of 126 bouts, though scoring only 8 knockouts.

Important early career wins
On April 21, 1934, he defeated Murray Brandt in a six-round points decision at Ridgewood Grove in Brooklyn.  He had formerly lost to Brandt in a six-round decision.

On May 31, 1934, he defeated Stanislaus Loayza in a six-round points decision at Fort Hamilton Arena in Brooklyn, New York. Stanislaus would contend for the NYSE World Lightweight Title in July 1935 against Jimmy Goodrich and was well known in his native Chile.

On November 17, 1934, he defeated Joe Rossi at the Ridgewood Grove in Brooklyn, New York in a six-round points decision. Rossi was another well rated New York welterweight who had previously beaten Jannazzo in six rounds on September 30, 1933, in Brooklyn. He would draw with Rossi in a six-round Brooklyn bout shortly after.

On January 7, 1935, he defeated Tony Falco at the St. Nicholas Arena in New York in a ten-round points decision. Jannazzo, with a reach advantage landed effective rights in the first, had an even second, and fought fiercely and evenly in the third and fourth. Jannazzo took the fifth with clean rights to the body and face while eluding Falco. Falco took the sixth using both hands, but Jannazzo may have taken the eighth with two stiff rights to the head of Falco near the end of the round.  Jannazzo may have taken the ninth with lefts to the face of Falco, though the tenth was even with both boxers too exhausted to land stiff blows.

At 145 pounds, Jannazzo fought Jackie Davis twice on January 26, and February 16, in eight round points decisions at Ridgewood Grove in Brooklyn, losing the first, but winning the second. Jannazzo had roughly a four-pound weight advantage in each bout.

Defeating Kid Azteca and Steve Halaiko
On March 2, 1935, he lost to Kid Azteca at the Arena Nacional in Mexico City in a ten-round points decision. In 1936, Azteca, Mexico City born, would take and hold the Mexican Welterweight title and fight in five separate decades in his native land.

On May 4, 1936, Jannazzo, at 145 1/2,  scored a small upset defeating top NYSE welterweight contender Billy Celebron at the St. Nicholas Arena in New York in a ten-round points decision. According to the United Press, Celebron won only three rounds with the fourth and seventh even.

On July 6, 1936, fighting at 145 1/2, he knocked out Steve Halaiko in the fourth of six rounds at the Dexter Park arena in Queens.

Win over former Light Welterweight Champion Johnny Jadick, draw with Ceferino Garcia
At 145 1/4 pounds, on July 22, 1936, he defeated former champion Johnny Jadick, in a ten-round points decision at the Dykman Oval in Manhattan. In a decisive win, Jannazzo put Jadick on the canvas in the first, fourth and sixth rounds.  The fight was a benefit for the United Palestine Appeal.  Jadick had previously taken the World Light Welterweight Championship on March 18, 1932, against Tony Canzoneri.

On October 30, 1936, he fought an important fifteen-round draw with Ceferino Garcia before a crowd of 5640 at New York's Madison Square Garden.  In a fairly close bout, the Associated Press gave eight rounds to Garcia, six to Jannazzo, and one even.  Jannazzo, a powerful hitter who had once floored Barney Ross, was thrown off in his attack by the scientific defense of Jannazzo, who was able to throw Garcia off balance from his attacks with his jabbing.  Garcia scored the fight's only knockdown in the eighth for a count of one with a strong right. In the seventh through the fifteenth, both boxers changed the pace from the more cautious early rounds, and unleashed continuous punches.  Garcia lost two of the first three rounds from penalties for low punches, and narrowly lost the other, but won most all of the remaining rounds through the ninth with a more aggressive display.  The tenth through the twelfth went to Jannazzo who effectively used jabs to Garcia's head, interfering with his punching.  Garcia would take the World Middleweight Championship in 1939.

Undisputed Welterweight Title bout against Barney Ross, November 1936
[[Image:Barney Ross.jpg|135px|left|thumb|Barney Ross]]
On November 27, 1936, he faced the incomparable triple division champion Barney Ross before 8,484 spectators in a NYSAC, NBA, and Ring Magazine recognized World Welterweight Championship at Madison Square Garden, losing in a fifteen-round unanimous decision. There were few serious knockdowns in the bout, a credit to Jannazzo, though Ross may have taken as many as nine rounds, clearly starting out with an edge in the first two.  Jannazzo was knocked down only briefly in the second and the fifth, for counts of one, and two, both from rights from Ross, though he likely slipped backing away in the fifth. The Associated Press had Ross with ten of the fifteen rounds, with four to Janazzo and one even. Janazzo showed pluck lasting fifteen rounds with Ross, even scoring with hard right crosses in the seventh, eighth, and tenth, though the outcome of the bout was never strongly in doubt.

On June 18, 1937, he defeated Phoenix welterweight Freddie Dixon in a ten-round points decision at the Municipal Stadium in Phoenix, Arizona.

Boxing in Sydney, Australia, and Hamburg, Germany, December 1937–38
On December 21, 1937, and January 25, 1938, he fought Jack Carroll and Dick Humphries in Sydney, Australia, losing both bouts in ten round points decisions.  The bout with Carroll, Australian Welterweight Champion, brought an enthused capacity crowd of 30,000, likely the largest crowd of Jannazzo's career.  Jannazzo was badly pummeled by Carroll's blows to both body and head, but never tired in the bout, and attempted to return counterpunches after each encounter. The bout was described as one of Carroll's best. "Jack Carroll Wins from Izzy Jannazzo", The Winnipeg Tribune gave Carroll nine of the ten rounds.

On October 15, 1938, he fought a fifteen-round draw with Gustav Eder, German Welterweight Champion, at Hanseaten Hall in Hamburg, Germany.  The bout was close, with Jannazzo scoring with fast lefts through the first seven rounds, but Eder scoring with rights to the head and body in the subsequent rounds.  The decision was unpopular with the enthusiastic home crowd of 10,000, among whom may felt Jannazzo had shown more science in the boxing and landed the more telling blows.  In a previous match in New York in September 1936 with Eder, Jannazzo had won a fifteen-round points decision.

On February 7, 1940, he defeated Jackie Burke in a ten-round points decision at the Watres Armory in Scranton, Pennsylvania.  Jannazzo battered Burke with both hands throughout the bout.

On April 10, 1940, he defeated Steve Mamakos at Riverside Stadium in Washington, D. C., in a ten-round split decision.

On September 4, 1940, he defeated Holman Williams in a ten-round points decision at Griffith Stadium in Washington, D.C.  In that year, Holman was rated seventh in the world among welterweights.  He would become a boxer of some renown, taking the World Colored Middleweight Championship on October 16, 1942, against Charley Burley in New Orleans, Louisiana.  Holman would lose the title to the "Cocoa Kid".  Williams had previously beaten Jannazzo on March 27, 1940, in Scranton, Pennsylvania in a ten-round points decision.  Williams, fighting at 150 in their March meeting, won from clever infighting in the later rounds, when Jannazzo may have tired from his strong opening rounds.

Taking the Welterweight Championship of the World (Maryland version), October 1940

He won the Welterweight Championship of the World (as recognized by Maryland state), fighting at 147 pounds against the Puerto Rican boxer "Cocoa Kid" on October 14, 1940, in a close fifteen round split decision before 3,000 fans at Carlin's Park in Baltimore, Maryland.  Jannazzo took the bout using a strong left jab, and effective footwork that left him out of the range of his Puerto Rican challenger.  The "Kid", who fought with a four-pound disadvantage, repeatedly tried to take the fight to Jannazzo but was stopped by Jannazzo's ever present left jab. Jack Dempsey refereed the bout.

Loss to future middleweight champion Georgie Abrams, December 1940

On December 12, 1940, Jannazzo lost to Georgie Abrams in a ten-round split decision at Carlin's Park in Baltimore.  Though leading in the first two rounds, Jannazzo lost the third, being called for a low blow. In the late rounds, a strong attack by Abrams gave him the decision.  Abrams dominated the infighting, but Jannazzo put on a more scientific and cautious defense.

Fighting at 145 1/2, on April 14, 1941, he defended the Maryland version of the World Welterweight Championship against Jimmy Leto in a fifteen-round split decision at the Coliseum in Baltimore, Maryland. Leto was a rated welterweight, and the victory was a significant one. Jannazzo once again used his strong left to win the bout, though the decision was somewhat disputed as the referee voted against Jannazzo, while both judges voted in his favor.

On September 21, 1942, in a lead-up to his fight with Sugar Ray Robinson, Jannazzo defeated Portuguese born Freddie Cabral in a ten-round points decision at the Valley Arena, in Holyoke, Massachusetts.

Bouts with Sugar Ray Robinson, October 1942 and March 1946
On October 19, 1942, he lost to the great Sugar Ray Robinson for the first time at the arena in Philadelphia, Pennsylvania, in a ten-round unanimous decision. Immediately after on December 1, 1942, he fought a return bout with Robinson at the Arena in Cleveland, Ohio, losing in an eighth round Technical Knockout.

He defeated "Wild" Bill McDowell of Dallas on June 17, 1943, in a ten-round points decision at Moers Field in Richmond, Virginia.  McDowell was unable to use his left hand for seven rounds, after injuring his right in the third.  McDowell had a ten-pound advantage over Jannazzo who weighed in at 149 1/2 pounds. It was a noteworthy win considering the disadvantages with which Jannazzo fought.

On May 9, 1944, he defeated Johnny Green at Memorial Auditorium before 3,893 fans in Buffalo, New York in a ten-round unanimous decision. Jannazzo, fighting at 152, won the bout with a well placed left, which he was unable to use to equal advantage in previous bouts with Green. Green had defeated and drawn with Jannazzo the previous February at the same venue in Buffalo.  Green was a black boxer from Buffalo who fought several of the same opponents as Jannazzo.

He defeated Charley Parham twice in July and September 1945 at the Auditorium in Milwaukee, Wisconsin. Jannazzo took the September bout by a unanimous decision with Parham winning only one round, but their July bout was somewhat closer.  Jannuzzo had "little trouble", however, in scoring the decision in their second meeting.

On November 16, 1945, he defeated Frankie Abrams before 3000 fans in a ten-round unanimous decision at Olympia Stadium in Detroit.  Jannazzo took every round but the last, when Abrams made a late rally.  Abrams scored four knockdowns in the second round, showing his dominance.

On March 14, 1946, he fought champion Sugar Ray Robinson for the last time in Baltimore, Maryland, losing in a ten-round unanimous decision before a somewhat disappointing crowd of 4100.  All three judges voted for Robinson. Jannazzo at 154, was outboxed by Robinson throughout the fight, and Robinson won every round.  He had formerly fought Robinson on October 13, 1944, in Boston Garden before a crowd of 7,347, losing in a second-round technical knockout.  Robinson had returned to the ring after fourteen months in the army, but had no trouble dropping Jannazzo twice in the second with well placed lefts and rights to the head, before asking the referee to end the fight.

On June 17, 1946, fighting at 151 3/4, he defeated Ralph Zannelli at the Rhode Island Auditorium in a ten-round points decision.

Fighting at 155 pounds on June 5, 1946, he defeated Joe Governale in a ten-round split decision at McArthur Stadium in Brooklyn, New York. He would lose to Governale at the same location in a ten-round decision one month later.

On January 28, 1947, he fought his last fight against Steve Belloise at the Orange Bowl in Miami, Florida.  Belloise scored a technical knockout in 2:20 of the third round, and his manager, Chris Dundee, announced Jannazzo's retirement after seventeen years in the ring.

Life after boxing
During WWII, Jannazzo worked as an air raid warden.  After retiring from boxing in 1947, Jannazzo eventually worked for the city managing an incinerator for the department of sanitation.  He retired at sixty-five to spend time with his children and grandchildren.

Around 1991, shortly after he moved to Columbus, Ohio, his family placed him in a nursing home, due primarily to the progressive boxing induced dementia from which he was suffering.

On June 18, 1995, Jannazzo died in Columbus, Ohio. He was buried in Forest Lawn Memorial Gardens in Columbus, where his wife had been buried three months earlier.

Professional boxing record

References

External links
 

Welterweight boxers
Middleweight boxers
Boxers from Alabama
Boxers from New York (state)
American people of Italian descent
1915 births
1995 deaths
American male boxers
Sportspeople from Birmingham, Alabama
People from Ensley, Alabama